Bruno Mora (29 March 1937 – 10 December 1986) was an Italian football player and coach, who played as a right winger. He began his club career with U.C. Sampdoria, and later won domestic and international titles with Juventus F.C. and A.C. Milan, before spending the final seasons of his career with A.C. Parma. At international level, he represented the Italy national team at the 1962 FIFA World Cup, where he scored Italy's fastest ever World Cup goal.

Club career
Mora played for 13 seasons in the Serie A for U.C. Sampdoria, Juventus F.C., A.C. Milan and A.C. Parma, scoring 63 goals in 245 appearances. He is mostly remembered for performances during his successful domestic and European stint with Milan, during which he won the 1963 European Cup Final against Benfica at Wembley Stadium, as well as the 1967 Coppa Italia final, and the 1967–68 Serie A title. Mora had also previously won the 1960–61 Serie A title with Juventus. He finished his career with Parma in the lower divisions, winning the 1969–70 Serie D title.

International career
Mora earned 21 caps and scored 4 goals for the Italy national team between 1959 and 1965. He made his international debut in a 1–1 draw against Hungary, in Florence, on 29 November 1959, and he was a member of the Italian side that took part in the 1962 FIFA World Cup in Chile. He scored a goal in the second minute of Italy's final group match against Switzerland, on 7 June 1962, although the 3–0 victory was not enough to prevent the Italians from controversially going out in the first round of the tournament. Along with Pietro Ferraris's goal against Norway in 1938 FIFA World Cup, this is Italy's fastest ever World Cup goal. A serious injury (following a collision with Bologna player Giuseppe Spalazzi) impeded him from taking part in the 1966 World Cup, and also affected his confidence and later performances.

Style of play
A quick and talented player, Mora was known for his skill, pace, eye for goal, and crossing ability, as well as his direct, offensive style of play on the right wing; during his prime he was regarded as one of the best players in the world in his position, and was known for his ability to get past opponents through his use of feints or sudden bursts of acceleration.

Death
Mora died in 1986, at the age of 49, due to a stomach tumour.

Honours
Milan
 European Cup: 1962–63
 Serie A: 1967–68
 Coppa Italia: 1966–67

Juventus
 Serie A: 1960–61

Parma
 Serie D: 1969–70

Individual
 A.C. Milan Hall of Fame

References

External links

 

1937 births
1986 deaths
Sportspeople from Parma
Italian footballers
Footballers from Emilia-Romagna
Association football forwards
Italy international footballers
1962 FIFA World Cup players
UEFA Champions League winning players
Serie A players
Serie D players
U.C. Sampdoria players
Juventus F.C. players
A.C. Milan players
Parma Calcio 1913 players
Italian football managers
Parma Calcio 1913 managers
Deaths from cancer in Emilia-Romagna
Deaths from stomach cancer